The Morning Star is the eighth studio album by American musician Daniel Bachman. It was released on July 27, 2018, by Three Lobed Recordings.

Critical reception
The Morning Star was met with "generally favorable" reviews from critics. At Metacritic, which assigns a weighted average rating out of 100 to reviews from mainstream publications, this release received an average score of 80 based on 9 reviews. Aggregator Album of the Year gave the release a 83 out of 100 based on a critical consensus of 5 reviews.

Thom Jurek of AllMusic noted the album is "at once brave and solitary, gentle and bracing, provocative and spiritually resonant. It extends Bachman's reach, allowing him to paint the innermost dimensions of the world he perceives and cleave it open for light to flood in and illuminate it for us."

Accolades

Track listing

Personnel

Musicians
 Daniel Bachman – Primary artist, guitar
 Forrest Marquisee – fiddle
 Ian McColm – cymbals

'Production
 Scott Caligan – layout
 Patrick Klem – mastering, mixing

References

2018 albums